Hexaphenylcarbodiphosphorane is the organophosphorus compound with the formula C(PPh3)2 (where Ph = C6H5).  It is a yellow, moisture-sensitive solid.  The compound is classified as an ylide and as such carries significant negative charge on carbon.  It is isoelectronic with bis(triphenylphosphine)iminium. The P-C-P angle is 131°.  The compound has attracted attention as an unusual ligand in organometallic chemistry.

The pure compound has two crystalline phases: a metastable monoclinic C2 phase that is triboluminescent, and an orthorhombic P222 form that is not. Both polymorphs are photoluminescent, with respective peak wavelengths at 540 and 575 nm.

Preparation
The compound was originally prepared by deprotonation of the phosphonium salt [HC(PPh3)2]Br using potassium.

An improved procedure entails production of the same double phosphonium salt from methylene bromide.  The double deprotonation is effected with potassium amide.

Related compounds
 Methylenetriphenylphosphorane (CH2=PPh3), the parent Wittig reagent

References

Organophosphorus compounds
Ligands